Sir Theodore Emmanuel Gugenheim Gregory (10 September 1890 – 24 December 1970) was a British economist.

Theodore Gregory was born in London on 10 September 1890. Gregory was educated at Dame Alice Owen's School in Islington. He attended the London School of Economics and Political Science. Gregory was an Assistant and Lecturer at the LSE between 1913 and 1919. Gregory was Cassel Reader in International Trade at the LSE in 1920. Gregory was Sir E. Cassel Professor of Economics in the University of London between 1927 and 1937. He was Dean of the Faculty of Economics at London University between 1927 and 1930. Gregory was a Senator of London University between 1928 and 1930. Gregory was the Newmarch Lecturer at University College London in 1929.

Gregory was a member of the Macmillan Committee on Industry and Finance from 1929 to 1931. He was Economic Adviser for the Niemeyer Mission to Australia and New Zealand in 1930. He was a member of the Irish Free State Banking Commission from 1934 to 1937. Gregory was Economic Adviser to the Government of India from 1938 to 1946. Gregory was Chairman of the Food Grains Policy Committee (India) in 1943.

Gregory was appointed an Honorary Fellow of the London School of Economics in 1958. He was appointed a Commander of the Order of George I of Greece. He was appointed a Commander of the Austrian Order of Merit. Gregory was appointed President of Section F of the British Association in 1930.

Gregory died in Athens on 24 December 1970.

List of works
 Present Position of Banking in America (1925) 
 The Return to Gold (1925)
 First Year of the Gold Standard (1926)
 Foreign Exchange (1927) 
 Introduction to Tooke and Newmarch's History of Prices (1928)
 The Practical Working of the Federal Reserve System in the US (1930)
 The Gold Standard and its Future (1932) 
 Gold, Unemployment, and Capitalism (1933)
 The Westminster Bank Through a Century (1936) 
 India on the Eve of the Third Five-Year Plan (1960) 
 Ernst Oppenheimer and the Economic Development of Southern Africa (1962)
 Select Statutes, Documents and Reports relating to British Banking (1964)

Further reading
'Gregory, Theodore Emanuel Gugenheim (1890–1970)'
by Neil Skaggs
in The Biographical Dictionary of British Economists
Published by Continuum 
Published in print January 2004 | 
Published online January 2010 | e-

References

1890 births
1970 deaths
British economists
Alumni of the London School of Economics
Academics of the London School of Economics
Recipients of the Decoration for Services to the Republic of Austria
Commanders of the Order of George I
People educated at Dame Alice Owen's School
Honorary Fellows of the London School of Economics
Knights Bachelor
People from Islington (district)